Adean Thomas (born 31 July 1994) is a Jamaican netball player. She was part of the Jamaican squad that won bronze at the 2018 Commonwealth Games.

References

1994 births
Living people
Jamaican netball players
Place of birth missing (living people)
Netball players at the 2018 Commonwealth Games
Commonwealth Games bronze medallists for Jamaica
Commonwealth Games medallists in netball
2019 Netball World Cup players
London Pulse players
Netball Superleague players
Jamaican expatriate netball people in England
Medallists at the 2018 Commonwealth Games
Medallists at the 2022 Commonwealth Games